The 1989 Senator Windows Welsh Professional Championship was a professional non-ranking snooker tournament, which took place between 13 and 18 February 1989 at the Newport Centre in Newport, Wales.

Doug Mountjoy won the tournament defeating Terry Griffiths 9–6 in the final.

Main draw

References

Welsh Professional Championship
Welsh Professional Championship
Welsh Professional Championship
Welsh Professional Championship